Schaff is a surname. Notable people with the surname include:

Adam Schaff, Polish Marxist philosopher
Albert Schaff (1885–1968), French footballer
David Schley Schaff (1852–1941), American Presbyterian clergyman and American football pioneer
Erin Schaff, American photographer and photojournalist
Gary Schaff (1959–2020), Canadian Paralympic athlete
Morris Schaff (1840–1929), American Union Army officer and writer
Philip Schaff (1819–1893), church historian
William Schaff, artist and musician

See also

Schaff–Herzog Encyclopedia of Religious Knowledge